The Anglican Diocese of Cameroon  is a diocese of the Church of the Province of West Africa, a member church of the worldwide Anglican Communion.  Its partner diocese is the Diocese of Chichester. It was created in 2008 and its current bishop is Dibo Thomas-Babyngton Elango.

References

Anglican dioceses established in the 21st century
Anglicanism in Cameroon
Anglican bishops of Cameroon
Christian organizations established in 2008
Dioceses of the Church of the Province of West Africa